The letter F with a hook (uppercase Ƒ, lowercase: ƒ) is a letter of the Latin script, based on the italic form of f; or on its regular form with a descender hook added. A very similar-looking letter,  (a dotless j with a hook and a horizontal stroke), is used in the IPA for a voiced palatal implosive.

Regular 

Italic 
The minuscule italic ƒ, also called the florin sign, is used as a symbol for several currencies, including the former Dutch guilder, the Aruban florin, and the Netherlands Antillean guilder. It can be found as italic in non-italic fonts.

The italic ƒ has been used to denote mathematical functions, or to indicate aperture in photography (e.g. ƒ/2.8) in place of the more common italic f (in serif fonts) or oblique f (in sans-serif fonts).

Appearance in computer fonts
Older fonts and character encodings included only the minuscule form for its use as an abbreviation. Unicode includes both the majuscule and the minuscule.
Because of its origin, the italic ƒ (f with a hook) looks exactly like the italic f (f) in some typefaces.

The character has been used on the Macintosh to mean folder, in particular as part of a folder name. For example, the game Bugdom, when included on some Mac OS 9 installations, was contained in a folder called "Bugdom ƒ". This usage has died out with the advent of Mac OS X. The Macintosh Programmer's Workshop also used the character to indicate software dependencies, from which the folder usage derived (the folder contained the files required to run the program). The character is created on the Macintosh by pressing .

The character frequently appears in Japanese mojibake.  The lead byte 0x83 appears before a Katakana character in Shift JIS, but if interpreted as Windows-1252 encoding, it becomes the ƒ character.

See also 
African reference alphabet
Ogonek

Notes

External links
Practical Orthography of African Languages

Latin letters with diacritics